Dave Holmquist (born May 1, 1951) is an American basketball coach.  He is the head men's basketball coach at Biola University in La Mirada, California. He began his career in 1975–76, coaching for three years at Fresno Pacific University, moving to Biola in 1978.

On November 24, 2015 Holmquist became the eighth men's college basketball coach in NCAA history to reach 900 career wins. On February 27, 2021 Holmquist became the fifth to reach 1000 career wins.

He finished the 2020–21 season with an overall coaching record of 1002–410.

Head coaching record

See also
 List of college men's basketball coaches with 600 wins

References

External links
 Biola profile

Living people
Biola Eagles men's basketball coaches
Biola Eagles men's basketball players
College men's basketball head coaches in the United States
Cypress Chargers men's basketball players
Fresno Pacific Sunbirds men's basketball coaches
American men's basketball players
1951 births